Wayside is a small unincorporated community in Roberts County, Texas, United States. It is part of the Pampa micropolitan statistical area and lies at an elevation of 3222 ft (982 m).

References

Unincorporated communities in Roberts County, Texas
Unincorporated communities in Texas
Pampa, Texas micropolitan area